Osceola High School (OHS) is a public high school located in Kissimmee, Florida, USA. The school was established on September 5, 1887 along with 20 other schools in Osceola County. It was referred to as "the Kissimmee school" until it received the name "Osceola High School" in 1889.

OHS enrolls students in grades 9-12 and is part of the School District of Osceola County. The school serves students within Kissimmee and enrolled 2,336 students as of the 2012-2013 school year. It is a minority-majority school in that students who identify as Hispanic outnumber students who identify as other ethnicities.

Demographics 
As of the 2012-2013 school year, the ethnic makeup of OHS is as follows:

Smaller Learning Communities 
Osceola High consists of small learning communities within the school, teams of teachers who work together to meet the individual needs and interests of their students.

Air Force JROTC (FL-921) 
Osceola High School's JROTC ranked second in the category of Best Overall Unit out of 17 in the state.

JROTC - In 2008-2009, 2013-2014, and 2014-2015 the color guards and drill teams won 1st place overall in the state of Florida

Awards and recognition 
Osceola High School has been rated an "A" school in the grading system that uses the Florida Comprehensive Assessment Test as its standard for two consecutive years.

Notable alumni 

 Charles H. Bronson,  Florida Department of Agriculture and Consumer Services commissioner
 William James Bryan, United States Senator of Florida
 John Hugh "Buddy" Dyer, mayor of Orlando and Florida State Senator
 Taula "Hikuleo" Fifita, professional wrestler
 A. J. McLean, singer from the Backstreet Boys
 Edwin Rios, Major League Baseball player
 Brett Williams, American football player
Markus Paul
 Vanessa Vanjie Mateo, Drag Queen from Rupaul's Drag Race

References

External links 
 The Warrior Record Online

Osceola County Public Schools
Schools in Kissimmee, Florida
Educational institutions established in 1887
1887 establishments in Florida
High schools in Osceola County, Florida
Public high schools in Florida